Casiguran, officially the Municipality of Casiguran,  is a 4th class municipality in the province of Sorsogon, Philippines. According to the 2020 census, it has a population of 35,602 people.

History
Established in the year 1600, Casiguran was the first missionary parish of Sorsogon. When the Spaniards first set foot in this part of Luzon in the 1570s, Casiguran was considered as their center of Kabikolan.

In 1583, the Franciscan missionaries took over the evangelization work started by the Augustinians.

A folk legend narrates that the name Casiguran originated phonetically from the Bicol phrase 'kasi gurang' (literally translated, "because old") as it was Sorsogon's first parish. Yet another narrative went that the nameless village's youngsters kept secluded to their homes, while only the elderly ventured outside; for fear that their children would be forced to servitude by the Spanish invaders.

Geography
Casiguran is located at the coast of Sorsogon Bay, at the south of Luzon island, making it a suburb of neighboring Sorsogon City.

Barangays

Casiguran is politically subdivided into 25 barangays.

Climate

Demographics

Economy

References

External links

 Casiguran Profile at PhilAtlas.com
 [ Philippine Standard Geographic Code]
 Philippine Census Information
 Local Governance Performance Management System

Municipalities of Sorsogon